Count Rudolph (or Rudolf) of Ponthieu (died 866) was a son of Welf (also Hwelf or Welf I) by Hedwig of Bavaria, and thus a brother of Judith of Bavaria, wife of Emperor Louis the Pious. Through Judith's influence, her brother Rudolph acquired and became Lay Abbot of the Abbeys of Saint Riquier and Jumieges.

In April 830, Frankish nobility revolted against Emperor Louis in order to "liberate" him from the influence of his wife Judith. Louis was placed under house arrest, whilst Judith and her brothers Rudolph and Conrad I, Count of Auxerre, were imprisoned in Aquitanian monasteries. The two brothers were later freed when their nephew Charles the Bald assumed the throne.

Marriage and children
Rudolph was married to Hruodun (died 867), who bore him:
 Conrad, Count of Paris and Sens (died 882)
 Welf, Abbot of Sainte-Colombe-de-Sens
 Hugh
 Rudolf, Duke of Rhaetia

References
The Carolingians, A family who forged Europe by Pierre Riche (translated by Michael Idomir Allen), University of Philadelphia Press, 1993
I Conti de' Marsi e la loro discendenze fino alla fondazione dell'Aquila by Cesare Rivera, Teramo, 1915

866 deaths
Carolingian dynasty
9th-century people from East Francia
Year of birth unknown